Carleton Place Airport  is located  southeast of Carleton Place, Ontario, Canada, west of Ottawa.

About

This airport was built by Marvin MacPherson and Dr. Wilf Roy, both of Carleton Place. The first flight was flown in a Piper Super Cub on skis in March 1959, piloted by MacPherson. 

In 2000, MacPherson and Allison Horton purchased this grass strip airport.

A flying club, COPA Flight 121 and an ultralight training school reside here.

Other local general aviation schools use this airport to practice their emergency grass strip student landings. The airport has also been used for Orange helicopter services, MNR helicopter services and DND exercises.

COPA Flight 121 hosts an annual fly-in BBQ, typically on the weekend following the Labour Day holiday.

The airfield has a few buildings including rental hangars.

See also
 List of airports in the Ottawa area

References

External links
Page about this airport on COPA's Places to Fly airport directory

Registered aerodromes in Ontario
Carleton Place
Buildings and structures in Lanark County